Derbeta is a genus of snout moths. It was described by Francis Walker in 1866, and contains the species Derbeta nigrifimbria. It is found in Brazil.

References

Chrysauginae
Monotypic moth genera
Moths of South America
Pyralidae genera